Calle Svensson (born 19 June 1987) is a Swedish football midfielder who plays for IK Sleipner.

In October 2022 Calle announced he will retire from football ending his career in IK Sleipner.

Club career
On 9 December 2021, he returned to IK Sleipner.

References

1987 births
Living people
Swedish footballers
Association football midfielders
IK Sleipner players
Nyköpings BIS players
GAIS players
Husqvarna FF players
Västerås SK Fotboll players
IFK Mariehamn players
Ettan Fotboll players
Superettan players
Veikkausliiga players
Swedish expatriate footballers
Expatriate footballers in Finland
Swedish expatriate sportspeople in Finland